Priscilla Bright McLaren (8 September 1815 – 5 November 1906) was a British activist who served and linked the anti-slavery movement with the women's suffrage movement in the nineteenth century. She was a member of the Edinburgh Ladies' Emancipation Society and, after serving on the committee, became the president of the Edinburgh Women's Suffrage Society.

Biography
She was born Priscilla Bright in Rochdale, Lancashire. She came from a Quaker family that believed in educating its women. Her father, Jacob Bright, had risen from weaver to bookkeeper to wealthy cotton manufacturer. His politics remained radical and he passed his activist interest to his children. Her mother, Martha, took an equal part in her husband's business concerns and created essay societies and debating clubs for her children. Skills that they developed in addressing an audience were later put to use by the daughters Margaret and Priscilla, as well as the most famous of the Bright sons, Radical MP John Bright.

Priscilla kept house for her brother, John, including looking after her niece Helen Bright Clark and believed that she had missed her own chance for a family life, but when John remarried, Priscilla accepted a suitor she had turned down twice before. Duncan McLaren was a twice-widowed Edinburgh merchant. He was considerably older than Priscilla and she became stepmother to his five children. For accepting Duncan on his third proposal, Priscilla was disowned by the Society of Friends (though she ignored this for the most part, continuing to attend Quaker meetings). Duncan built a political career as an alderman, Lord Provost, and then Liberal Member of Parliament in 1865. They worked together on many campaigns, described by contemporaries as 'equal partners'. They had three children together and lived at Newington House.

After the Ladies' Emancipation Society came to an end, Eliza Wigham, Jane Smeal, and some of their friends set up the Edinburgh chapter of the National Society for Women's Suffrage. Eliza Wigham and McLaren's step-daughter Agnes McLaren became the secretaries, Priscilla McLaren was the president and Elizabeth Pease Nichol was the treasurer.

McLaren died in Edinburgh on 5 November 1906, shortly after giving her written support for more suffragettes who had been imprisoned for their militancy. She was buried beside her husband in St Cuthbert's Kirkyard, Edinburgh.

Legacy
Four women associated with Edinburgh were the subject of a campaign by Edinburgh historians in 2015. The group intended to gain recognition for Priscilla Bright McLaren, Elizabeth Pease Nichol, Eliza Wigham and Jane Smeal – the city's "forgotten heroines".

Her name and picture (and those of 58 other women's suffrage supporters) are on the plinth of the statue of Millicent Fawcett in Parliament Square, London, unveiled in 2018.

References

British women activists
1815 births
1906 deaths
People from Rochdale
Priscilla Bright
National Society for Women's Suffrage